Callitris is a genus of coniferous trees in the Cupressaceae (cypress family). There are 16 recognized species in the genus, of which 13 are native to Australia and the other three (C. neocaledonica, C. sulcata and C. pancheri) native to New Caledonia. Traditionally, the most widely used common name is cypress-pine, a name shared by some species of the closely related genus Actinostrobus.

Description
The leaves are evergreen and scale-like. But young seedlings have needle-like leaves; in C. macleayana, needle-like leaves are found mixed with scale leaves throughout the tree's life. The scales are arranged in six rows along the twigs, in alternating whorls of three (often in whorls of four in C. macleayana).

The cones remain closed on the trees for many years, opening only after being scorched by a bushfire; this then releases the seeds to grow on the newly cleared burnt ground.

Taxonomy
The genus is divided into two sections, with the atypical C. macleayana in sect. Octoclinis, and all the other species in sect. Callitris. Some botanists treat C. macleayana in a separate genus, as Octoclinis macleayana. C. macleayana is also distinct in occurring in rainforest on the east coast of Australia; the other species all grow on dry sites.

The closest relative of Callitris is Actinostrobus from southwest Western Australia, which differs in its cones having several basal whorls of small sterile scales. A 2010 study of Actinostrobus and Callitris places the three species of Actinostrobus within an expanded Callitris based on analysis of 42 morphological and anatomical characters.

In 2010, early Oligocene fossilised foliage and cones of Callitris were unearthed near the Lea River in Tasmania. The fossils were given the name Callitris leaensis and represent the oldest known representative of the genus.

Species

The genus includes the following species:

 Callitris baileyi – SE QLD, NE NSW
 Callitris canescens – S WA, S SA
 Callitris columellaris – south-east QLD (coastal); naturalised in Hawaii and southern Florida. Previously synonymous with C. glaucophylla, C. endlicheri and C. intratropica.
 Callitris drummondii – S WA
 Callitris endlicheri – NSW, QLD, VIC (hilly areas); naturalised in Hawaii and St Helena
 Callitris glaucophylla - NSW, Qld, SA, NT, WA (most common)
 Callitris intratropica - NT (blue cypress)
 Callitris macleayana – QLD, NSW
 Callitris monticola – QLD, NSW
 Callitris muelleri – NSW
 Callitris neocaledonica – New Caledonia
 Callitris oblonga – NSW, TAS
 Callitris pancheri – New Caledonia
 Callitris preissii – SA, VIC, WA, NSW
 Callitris rhomboidea – NSW, QLD, VIC, TAS, naturalised on New Zealand's North Island
 Callitris roei – S WA
 Callitris sulcata – New Caledonia
 Callitris verrucosa – SA, VIC, WA, NSW, QLD

Doubtful names
The following names are of doubtful validity:

 Callitris arenosa Sweet, nom. inval., nom. nud., type not cited, identity uncertain. 
 Callitris columellaris f. glauca F.M.Bailey, described from Qld, type not located, identity uncertain (Hill, 1998). 
 Callitris conglobata Heynh., nom. inval., nom. nud, described from New Holland, type not located, identity uncertain. 
 Callitris elegans Heynh. (or Sieber ex Heynh.), nom. inval., nom. nud, described from "New Holland", type not located, identity uncertain. 
 Callitris intermedia''' R.T.Baker & H.G.Sm., nom. inval., identity uncertain (Hill, 1998). 
 Callitris montana Heynh., nom. inval., nom. nud, described from New Holland, type not located, identity uncertain. 
 Callitris pyramidalis Sweet, nom. inval., nom. nud, syn. Frenela pyramidalis (Sweet) Parl., nom. inval., nom. nud, type not cited, identity uncertain. 
 Callitris macrocarpa Vent., nom. inval. nom. nud, syn Cupressus macrocarpa (Vent.) A.Cunn., nom. inval., identity uncertain.

Human use
The wood of cypress-pines is light, soft and aromatic. It can be easily split and resists decay; cypress-pine is also termite resistant. It is used to make furniture, indoor and outdoor paneling, and fence posts. Cypress-pines are occasionally planted as ornamental trees, but their use is restricted by the high risks imposed by their very high flammability in bushfires.

Previously a plantation of C. intratropica'' was established outside of Darwin for use in house construction. After Cyclone Tracey it was realised that the timber did not resist strong winds and the plantation was abandoned. The trees are now used for the production of a blue essential oil, rich in guaiol and chamazulene (the blue compound). A number of therapeutic effects are attributed to the essential oil, including antimicrobial and anti-inflammatory effects.

References

External links

 Gymnosperm Database - Callitris
 Arboretum de Villardebelle - Photos of cones

 
Conifer genera

pl:Cyprzyk